Calliodis temnostethoides is a species of bugs in the family Lyctocoridae. It is found in North America. Adults are often found near clusters of dead leaves, as the species is saproxylic, living in dead wood.

References

Further reading

 

Lyctocoridae
Articles created by Qbugbot
Insects described in 1884
Hemiptera of North America